Jiyeong Mun (also known as Chloe Ji-yeong Mun; born 19 December 1995) is a South Korean classical pianist. She drew international attention when she won  the Geneva International Competition in Switzerland in 2014 and then the Busoni International Competition in 2015 consecutively.

Early life 
Jiyeong Mun was born in Yeosu, Jeollanam-do, South Korea on 19 December 1995. She began learning piano at the age of six and attending a local piano school in her hometown Yeosu, South Korea until 12. She started to distinguish herself in several domestic competitions and won the 8th International Competition for Young Pianists Arthur Rubinstein in Memoriam in 2009. Her success with less fortunate background drew media attention, especially when she won the Ettlingen International Competition for Young Pianists in Germany in 2012.

Education 
Since 2010, she has been taught by the pianist and professor Kim Dae-jin, and is currently pursuing a graduate course at Korea National University of Arts.

Career 
Mun drew international attention when she won the Geneva International Competition in Switzerland in 2014 and then the Busoni International Competition in Italy in 2015. She was the first Asian first prize winner of the Busoni International competition. Since then she performed with internationally renowned orchestras and conductors such as Alexander Shelley, Valentina Peleggi, Dietrich Paredes, and Massimo Belle and Myung-whun Chung. In 2017, she toured in Italy with the Haydn Orchestra led by the conductor Benjamin Bayl. She has actively performed in chamber music and recitals around the world.

She released her debut album for Deutsche Grammophon in 2017.

Awards 
2009: International Competition for Young Pianists 'The Arthur Rubinstein in Memoriam' in Poland

2012: Ettlingen International Competition for Young Pianists in Germany

2014: Takamatsu International Piano Competition in Japan

2014: Geneva International Competition in Switzerland

2015: Busoni International Competition in Italy

Discography 
2017: Robert Schumann: Piano Sonata No. 1; Fantasie (Deutsche Grammophon)

References

External links 

Official Website
Concerto Classic's artist page for Chloe Mun
The Geneva International Competition 2014 final review by New York Concert Review, Inc.
Chloe (Jiyeong) Mun at Busoni Laureates page 
Ji-Yeong Mun at Association Jeunes Talents

1995 births
People from Yeosu
South Korean women pianists
Living people
South Korean classical pianists
Women classical pianists
Prize-winners of the Ferruccio Busoni International Piano Competition
21st-century classical pianists
21st-century women pianists